The Longfeng Fishing Port is a fish harbor in Zhunan Township, Miaoli County, Taiwan.

History
The steel bridge which spans over the port was constructed in 2008.

Geology
The sea offshore of the port contains many reefs, making it an area rich of fish population of different species.

Architecture
The port also features a steel bridge and fish market which opens every first weekend of the month.

See also
 Fisheries Agency

References

Ports and harbors of Miaoli County